Gevindu Kumaratunga (born 30 November 1964) is a Sri Lankan politician and Member of Parliament.

Kumaratunga was born on 30 November 1964. He is the grandson of writer Kumaratunga Munidasa and secretary of the Cumaratunga Munidasa Foundation. He is the owner of Visidunu Prakashakayo publishers and Kiyawana Nuwana bookshop in Nugegoda. He is chairman of Yuthukama Sanwada Kawaya, a group affiliated to the Sri Lanka Podujana Peramuna. Following the 2020 parliamentary election he was appointed to the Parliament of Sri Lanka as a National List MP representing the Sri Lanka People's Freedom Alliance.

References

1964 births
Living people
Members of the 16th Parliament of Sri Lanka
Sinhalese politicians
Sri Lankan publishers (people)
Sri Lanka People's Freedom Alliance politicians
Sri Lanka Podujana Peramuna politicians